Mordvinovka is a rural locality (a village) in Silantyevsky Selsoviet, Birsky District, Bashkortostan, Russia. The population was 20 as of 2010.  There is 1 street.

Geography 
Mordvinovka is located 19 km south of Birsk (the district's administrative centre) by road. Kamyshinka is the nearest rural locality.

References 

Rural localities in Birsky District